The Treaty of Wapakoneta was signed on August 8, 1831. Remnants of the Shawnee Native American tribe in Wapakoneta were forced to relinquish claims that they had to land in western Ohio.

In exchange, the United States government agreed to provide the tribe with 100,000 acres (400 km²) of land west of the Mississippi River. The United States officials agreed to provide supplies and  monetary payment and to construct a sawmill and a gristmill for the Shawnees on their newly allocated land. This agreement became known as the Treaty of Wapakoneta or the Treaty with the Shawnee.

The treaty, along with several other agreements between indigenous tribes and the United States government, marked the slow but gradual removal of native people to land west of the Mississippi River, a policy known as Indian removal.

References
Ohio Historical Society, 2005, "Treaty of Wapakoneta (1831)", Ohio History Central: An Online Encyclopedia of Ohio History.
Full text of the Treaty of Wapakoneta

History of Ohio
Shawnee history
Wapakoneta
1831 treaties
1831 in the United States
Wapakoneta, Ohio
August 1831 events
Native American history of Ohio